Karin at the Shore is a watercolor by Carl Larsson from 1908.

Description
The watercolor depicts Carl Larsson's wife Karin, (born Bergöö), in the garden outside the home of Lilla Hyttnäs at Sundbornsån in Dalarna, a sunny day.

The watercolor was reproduced in Carl Larsson's On the sunny side: a book about the dwelling, about children, about you, about flowers, about everything: outside the home, which was published in 1910. It contains reproductions of 32 paintings with text.

Provenance 
The painting was purchased by the City of Malmö in the Baltic Exhibition from 1914. It is held by the Malmö Art Museum.

References

External links 
 Åt Solsidan på Litteraturbankens webbplats

1908 paintings
Paintings in Sweden
Paintings by Carl Larsson
Portraits of women
Women in Sweden
Dalarna